Endocrine (subtitle: International Journal of Basic and Clinical Endocrinology) is a peer-reviewed medical journal covering endocrinology. It was established in 1993 as the Endocrine Journal, and obtained its current name the following year. The editor-in-chief is Sebastiano Filetti (Sapienza University of Rome). According to the Journal Citation Reports, the journal has a 2014 impact factor of 3.878.

References

External links

Endocrinology journals
Publications established in 1993
Springer Science+Business Media academic journals
English-language journals
9 times per year journals